The Pollock Depot is a historic former railroad station on Avenue A in Pollock, South Dakota.  It is a wood-frame structure with a gable roof, with two sections, one two stories, and the other a single story.  The station was built in 1901 to Plan 3104, one of five plans used by the Minneapolis, St. Paul and Sault Ste. Marie Railroad (aka the "Soo Line") for its stations.  The establishment of the station at this location resulted in the founding of the town of Pollock, whose buildings were moved here from other area communities.  The single-story section, divided into seven sections by large brackets, originally housed freight, while the two-story section provided passenger facilities on the first floor with living quarters for railroad workers above.

In 1995 the building was converted into a hunting lodge. It was listed on the National Register of Historic Places in 1996.

References

Railway stations on the National Register of Historic Places in South Dakota
Railway stations in the United States opened in 1901
Transportation in Campbell County, South Dakota
1901 establishments in South Dakota
National Register of Historic Places in Campbell County, South Dakota
Former Soo Line stations
Former railway stations in South Dakota